Barilla Sharif بڑیلہ شریف is a village in Gujrat District, Punjab, Pakistan. It is one of the oldest villages in Gujrat. It is around 38 km away from Gujrat City and 24 km from Jalalpur Jattan جلال پورجٹاں.

Grave 
An exceptional grave was discovered in 1902 BC. Legend says it is that of Qanbeet, a biblical son of Adam, although documentary evidence supports a biblical name 

The grave is covered by a large hall and is marked by white marble. The graveyard is called "Peer Sachyar" but this also lacks provenance. A small mosque was built by the Pakistan Army during 1971 near the end of the grave. Bames of Shuhada are written on one of its walls.

This village is famous for Khanqah. a Muslim Saint Hazrat Khwaja Maulvi Muhammad Hafeez Ullah Chishti Qadri. His influence and teachings got this village's name changed from Barila to Barilla Sharif. Khanqah got followers across Pakistan and beyond.

Economy 
Historically villager's main occupation has been agriculture. The village has separate high schools for boys and girls. Ssome private schools are available

Health care 
The village has a primary health care facility

History 
The aristocracy was broken during WWII and Second Industrial Revolution when agriculture decline and urbanization started.

Populated places in Gujrat District